Neoklis Sylikiotis (born 24 January 1959) is a Cypriot politician. Since July 2014, he is a Member of the European Parliament and Vice-Chair of GUE/NGL. Sylikiotis was the Cypriot Minister of the Interior between September 2006 and July 2007, and again, between March 2008 and March 2012. Between March 2012 and February 2013, he was Minister of Commerce, Industry and Tourism. Sylikiotis is a member of leftist party AKEL.

Personal life and education
Sylikiotis was born in Limassol in 1959. He studied mechanical engineering at RWTH Aachen. He is married and has a son.

References

External links
 

1959 births
Living people
MEPs for Cyprus 2014–2019
Progressive Party of Working People MEPs
Health ministers of Cyprus
Cyprus Ministers of the Interior
Cyprus Ministers of Energy, Commerce, Industry and Tourism